The 2004–05 season was the 108th season of competitive football by Heart of Midlothian, and their 22nd consecutive season in the top level of Scottish football, competing in the Scottish Premier League. Hearts also competed in the UEFA Cup, Scottish Cup, League Cup and the Festival Cup.

Managers

Over the course of the season Hearts had 4 Management teams. They started the season under Craig Levein who left the club on 29 October to join Leicester City. His assistant Peter Houston took charge as care taker manager for 1 game before John Robertson took on the role for 7 months before a fall out with Romanov who dismissed him after he refused to accept a demotion to assistant head coach created a vacancy once again. Steven Pressley and John McGlynn jointly took the role of care taker managers for the final two games of the season.

Stadium

Hearts used two stadiums over the course of the season Tynecastle Stadium for domestic fixtures and Murrayfield Stadium for international fixtures. This was due to Tynecastle not meeting Uefa requirements for holding international fixtures.

The Campaign
One of the most important matches in the clubs campaign this season was in the UEFA Cup group stage. On matchday three they played away in St. Jakob-Park in front of 21,650 spectators, with Kristinn Jakobsson (Iceland) as referee, against Basel. Hearts had lost their first two games in the group. Basel started well into the game and their striker Christian Giménez slashed a hard shot towards the far corner of the goal in the opening minutes, which needed a good save from keeper Craig Gordon. The young goalkeeper blocked the shot into the field, but Julio Hernán Rossi was not able to reach the rebound. Basel dominated the game, they restricted the visitors immensely and Hearts were only able to entered the Basel penalty area from set-pieces. Following a free-kick and a near miss from Michael Stewart, just minutes later Hearts took a surprise lead. A set-piece and Hearts surprisingly played the ball low, three quick passes, Dennis Wyness found room and the striker slotted the ball beyond goalkeeper Pascal Zuberbühler for the first goal of the game. The home team were now forced to be more committed with their attacks and they put Hearts under increased pressure, responding well to the conceded goal. Only some desperate last-ditch defending denied the hosts from obtaining their equaliser. Basel then started the second half as they had ended the first period, pressing forward. Basel's head-coach Christian Gross changed his attackers midway through the second half and his substitutions quickly paid out. César Carignano slotted home the equaliser. Basel pressed hard for the winning goal as the time ticked on. Hearts' last-gasp winner, in the 89th minute, was more a speculative attack and was made only to relieve the defensive pressure, but it paid off as Robbie Neilson pushed his shot under the body of goalie Zuberbühler with only seconds left on the clock, his first ever goal for the club. Basel versus Hearts 1–2 end result.

First-team squad
Squad at end of season

Left club during season

Fixtures

Pre-Season Friendlies

Scottish Premier League

UEFA Cup

First round

Group stage / Group A

Festival Cup

League Cup

Scottish Cup

Final league table

See also
List of Heart of Midlothian F.C. seasons

References

Notes

External links 
 Official Club website
 Complete Statistical Record

Heart of Midlothian F.C. seasons
Heart of Midlothian